CIMPA offers PLM Product Lifecycle Management (PLM) consulting and services with the overall objective to increase operational efficiency and performance. With around 940 employees, CIMPA is represented across Europe and provides services worldwide. CIMPA is headquartered in Blagnac (Toulouse), France. Other offices are located in Saint Aubin de Médoc (Bordeaux Area), Aix en Provence, Bouguenais (Nantes Suburbs) and Sèvres (Paris Area). Hamburg and Ottobrunn in Germany, Filton/Bristol in the United Kingdom and Madrid in Spain.

CIMPA operates on a worldwide basis in the aerospace and defense industry as well as automotive, energy and transportation.
The annual turnover reached 124 million € in 2019. It was a fully owned subsidiary of Airbus until sold to Sopra-Steria in 2015.

History 

CIMPA was founded in 1995 as a spin-off by employees of the Corporate Research Center of Aerospatiale (now Airbus) in Suresnes, France.

CIMPA quickly expanded naturally to Toulouse and Nantes (France) for Aerospatiale projects, in Hamburg in 2001 (Germany) for new European Aerospace consortium EADS projects, then, in 2006 Filton (UK) and in Madrid in 2013 (Spain). In 2003, as an established company in the aviation and aerospace industry, CIMPA became a 100% owned subsidiary of Airbus SAS. From this point on, the name Airbus CIMPA or CIMPA SAS/ GmbH/Ltd is used. With further business in the south of Germany, CIMPA opened offices in Ottobrunn (2011).

Since October 2015 CIMPA is a 100% owned subsidiary of Sopra Steria Group.

Products and support 
CIMPA PLM Services  are based on effective business processes, integrated information systems, smooth supplier collaboration and In-Service Lifecycle Management, particularly in connection with CAD, CAM and PDM software. CIMPA offers customised solutions along the entire process chain without being bound to software vendors. 
The offer covers all the product lifecycle phases, from creating or refreshing a PLM strategy to deploying processes, methods and tools as well as educating and training

The service offering includes:
Business Processes
Consulting
Solution integration
Support and Training

CIMPA is specialized in complex IS/IT products, processes and supports:
Application consulting
Configuration management
Optimisation of project and programme management
PDM implementation, integration & support
PLM harmonisation projects
Process optimisation
Supplier collaboration
Technical training & workshops

CIMPA addresses the Aerospace and Defence, Automotive, Energy and Transportation industries.

References

Airbus